Caldbeck is a village in Cumbria, England, historically within Cumberland, it is situated within the  Lake District National Park. The village had 714 inhabitants according to the census of 2001.

The parish church is dedicated to St. Kentigern.

Caldbeck's closest fell is High Pike.

Etymology
" 'The cold stream'; ON 'kaldr', 'bekkr'. The village and parish are named from the 'Cald Beck'..." (ON=Old Norse). " 'bekkr'...is the usual Lakeland name for 'stream', occurring some 200 times..."

Caldbeck transmitting station

The Caldbeck transmitting station is  outside of the village. The Caldbeck transmitting station is a 1,106 ft television and radio broadcasting station that covers most of northern Cumbria and south west Scotland.

Also located further outside the village is the Sandale transmitting station.

Governance
The village is in the parliamentary constituency of Penrith and the Border.

For Local Government purposes it is in the Warnell Ward of Allerdale Borough Council and the Thursby Ward of Cumbria County Council.

Caldbeck along with neighbouring village Hesket Newmarket, has its own parish council, Caldbeck Parish Council.

Northern Fells Group
Prince Charles has visited the village several times in recent times, overseeing the launch of the Northern Fells Rural Project, and in later years the end of the project, which became the Northern Fells Group.

Notable people
 Chris Bonington,  the climber lives in the village
 Julia Marlowe, the American Shakespearean actress was born in Caldbeck, daughter of the 1860s village shoemaker.
 John Peel, the huntsman is Caldbeck's most infamous/famous former resident, his grave is in the local churchyard.
 Eddie Stobart
 Edward Stobart
 William Stobart

See also

Listed buildings in Caldbeck
German mines at Caldbeck
Eddie Stobart Logistics
Stobart Group
Callbeck

References

External links

  Cumbria County History Trust: Caldbeck (nb: provisional research only - see Talk page)

 
Villages in Cumbria
Civil parishes in Cumbria
Allerdale